Holden is a town in Worcester County, Massachusetts, United States. The town was founded in 1741, and the Town Square (Center, Common) was donated by John Hancock, former Governor of Massachusetts. The population was 19,905 at the 2020 census.

History 
Holden was named for Samuel Holden, a director of the Bank of England.

Geography
The landscape is compiled of hills and rivers, including the Quinapoxet.

Holden is bounded on the west by Rutland, on the northwest by Princeton, on the east by Sterling and West Boylston, on the southeast by Worcester, and on the southwest by Paxton.

Demographics

As of the census of 2000, there were 15,621 people, 5,715 households, and 4,423 families residing in the town. The racial makeup of the town was 97.39% White, 0.49% African American, 0.10% Native American, 0.99% Asian, 0.01% Pacific Islander, 0.24% from other races, and 0.79% from two or more races. Hispanic or Latino of any race were 0.96% of the population.

There were 5,715 households, out of which 37.4% had children under the age of 18 living with them, 67.8% were married couples living together, 7.2% had a female householder with no husband present, and 22.6% were non-families. 19.5% of all households were made up of individuals, and 9.7% had someone living alone who was 65 years of age or older. The average household size was 2.71 and the average family size was 3.13.

In the town, the population was spread out, with 27.0% under the age of 18, 5.1% from 18 to 24, 26.9% from 25 to 44, 26.7% from 45 to 64, and 14.2% who were 65 years of age or older. The median age was 40 years. For every 100 females, there were 93.4 males. For every 100 females age 18 and over, there were 89.7 males.

The median income for a household in the town was $64,297, and the median income for a family was $73,614. Males had a median income of $52,203 versus $36,194 for females. The per capita income for the town was $27,971. About 2.0% of families and 3.1% of the population were below the poverty line, including 3.3% of those under age 18 and 4.8% of those age 65 or over.

Government

Education

Schools

Holden is part of the five-town Wachusett Regional School District that includes the neighboring towns of Paxton, Princeton, Rutland, and Sterling. The towns share the newly renovated Wachusett Regional High School. Wachusett was the first regional school district in Massachusetts.

Holden has three elementary schools: Davis Hill Elementary, Dr. Leroy E. Mayo Elementary, and Dawson Elementary. The town is served by Mountview Middle School for grades 6–8 which was newly built in 2016. High school students may choose to attend Wachusett Regional High School in Holden or Montachusett Regional Vocational Technical School ("Monty Tech") in Fitchburg.

Holden also serves as the hometown for Holden Christian Academy, a PS–8 private Christian school.

Library

The Holden public library first opened in 1888. In fiscal year 2008, the town of Holden spent 1.99% ($679,756) of its budget on its public library—approximately $40 per person, per year.

Points of interest
 Alden Research Laboratory
 Steel rotating boom, for testing of hydraulic meters, an ASME historic landmark

Notable people

 Dan Colman, professional poker player, the winner of $40,000,000 Big One for One Drop
 Lewis Evangelidis, Worcester County sheriff and former MA state representative
 Ron Hallstrom, NFL football player for the Green Bay Packers and Philadelphia Eagles
 Matthew Quick, author of The Silver Linings Playbook and Boy 21
 Fran Quinn, professional golfer
 Tyler Rand, American arts executive
 Bruce Taylor, former pitcher for the Detroit Tigers

References

External links

 Town of Holden official website
 Holden page on NeighborhoodScout

 
Towns in Worcester County, Massachusetts
Populated places established in 1741
1741 establishments in Massachusetts
Towns in Massachusetts